Walter Bussmann (20 October 1904 – 11 February 1957) was a Swiss cross-country skier. He competed in the men's 18 kilometre event at the 1928 Winter Olympics.

References

External links
 

1904 births
1957 deaths
Swiss male cross-country skiers
Olympic cross-country skiers of Switzerland
Cross-country skiers at the 1928 Winter Olympics
Place of birth missing